2013 Women's Volleyball Thai-Denmark Super League was the first edition of the tournament. It was held at the MCC Hall of The Mall Ngamwongwan in Nonthaburi, Thailand from 8 – 11 June 2013.

Qualification

Final round

1st-8th places

Quarterfinals round

|}

5th–8th places 

|}

Semifinals

|}

7th place

|}

5th place

|}

3rd place

|}

Final

|}

Final standing

External links
  Competitive information

Thai-Denmark Super League
Volleyball,Thai-Denmark Super League
Women's,2013